William Andrew Shore (born 29 December 1955) is an English former footballer who played as a central defender.

Career
Shore made a solitarity Football League appearance for Mansfield Town, coming in the club's victorious 1974–75 season. Following his time at Mansfield, Shore subsequently signed for Chelmsford City.

References

1955 births
Living people
Association football defenders
English footballers
People from Kirkby-in-Ashfield
Footballers from Nottinghamshire
Mansfield Town F.C. players
Chelmsford City F.C. players
English Football League players